Sir Charles John Owens, CB (26 September 1845 – 17 January 1933) was a British railway manager.

Entering the service of the London and South Western Railway when he was 17, he rose to be its general manager from 1898 to 1912, and a director from 1912 to 1923. From 1923 to 1930 he was a director of the Southern Railway.

Owens was a member of the Commission of Lieutenancy of the City of London, a member of the Royal Commission on Imperial Free Trade, and the chairman of the British and Foreign Bible Society.

Owens was knighted on 18 December 1902, and appointed a Companion of the Order of the Bath (CB) in 1917.

References

External links 

 

London and South Western Railway people
Knights Bachelor
Companions of the Order of the Bath
Southern Railway (UK) people
1845 births
1933 deaths